Le Ponant is a three-masted, commercially operated French luxury yacht operated by Compagnie du Ponant. The ship has capacity for up to 32 passengers in 16 cabins. It was built 1991 by the Societe Francaise de Construction Navales (SFCN) shipyard in Villeneuve-la-Garenne, France. In 2008, the ship was attacked by Somali pirates and was only released after a military intervention. In 2022, the yacht was refitted for increased environmental protection to a design by Jean-Philippe Nuel Studio.

Description
On board, Le Ponant has one restaurant. Le Diamant panoramic restaurant offers buffet breakfast and dinner as well as fine gastronomic cuisine. 

Le Ponant was entirely refitted and refurbished in 2022. Having been totally renovated with a design by the Jean-Philippe Nuel Studio, the end result was 16 staterooms for a maximum of 32 guests. Le Ponant, which will navigate under sail as often as possible, includes other improvements such as a dockside connection, an innovative system of SCR filters to eliminate fine particles and reduce nitrogen oxide emissions by 90%, waste sorting and a state-of-the-art water treatment system – all to help protect the environment.

2008 Somali pirate attack
On 4 April 2008, Le Ponant was seized by Somali pirates in the Gulf of Aden while en route from the Seychelles to the Mediterranean. The ship carried no passengers at the time of its capture, but all 30 crewmembers were taken hostage; 22 French, 6 Filipino, 1 Cameroonian and 1 Ukrainian. The hostages were released without incident on 12 April.

Following the release, French helicopters from the Djibouti military base tracked the pirates  to the village of Jariban. French commando marine and GIGN operating from the frigate  and the cruiser  moved in when the pirates attempted to flee in the desert. A sniper disabled the get-away vehicle, and the commandos were able to capture six men. Local officials claimed that three people died in the raid, with a further eight wounded, but France denied this. Troops also recovered some of the ransom money paid by the owner of the yacht for the release of its crew. The six captured pirates were flown to Paris, where they faced trial in 2012.

Footnotes

References

External links

 Compagnie du Ponant official site page about the ship

  

1991 ships
Battles and conflicts without fatalities
Conflicts in 2008
France–Somalia relations
Maritime incidents in 2008
Naval battles involving pirates
Operations involving French special forces
Piracy in Somalia
Ships attacked and captured by pirates
Ships built in France
Ships of Compagnie du Ponant